The 2017 Ladies Championship Gstaad was a women's tennis tournament, part of the International category of the 2017 WTA Tour. The 25th edition of the tournament took place on the outdoor clay courts at Roy Emerson Arena in Gstaad, Switzerland, from 17-23 July 2017.

Points and prize money

Point distribution

Prize money

Singles main draw entrants

Seeds

 1 Rankings are as of 3 July 2017.

Other entrants
The following players received wildcards into the main draw:
  Rebeka Masarova 
  Amra Sadiković 
  Patty Schnyder 

The following players received entry from the qualifying draw:
  Başak Eraydın
  Anna Kalinskaya 
  Antonia Lottner 
  Tereza Smitková 
  Martina Trevisan 
  Anna Zaja

Withdrawals
Before the tournament
  Timea Bacsinszky →replaced by  Elitsa Kostova
  Bethanie Mattek-Sands →replaced by  Tereza Martincová
  Samantha Stosur →replaced by  Sílvia Soler Espinosa

Retirements
  Sara Sorribes Tormo

Doubles main draw entrants

Seeds

1 Rankings are as of 3 July 2017.

Other entrants 
The following pairs received wildcards into the doubles main draw:
  Ylena In-Albon /  Conny Perrin
  Amra Sadiković /  Jil Teichmann

Champions

Singles 

  Kiki Bertens def.  Anett Kontaveit, 6–4, 3–6, 6–1

Doubles 

  Kiki Bertens /  Johanna Larsson def.  Viktorija Golubic /  Nina Stojanović, 7–6(7–4), 4–6, [10–7]

References

External links 
 

Ladies Championship Gstaad
Ladies Championship Gstaad
WTA Swiss Open
ladies